WAST may refer to:

 WAST (Ohio), a defunct daytime-only radio station licensed to Ashtabula, Ohio, US
 WAST-LP, a defunct low-power television station in Ashland, Wisconsin, US
 WNYT (TV), formerly WAST, a television station licensed to Albany, New York, US
 Wast Water, a lake in Cumbria, England
 wast, a past-tense form of to be formerly used with the pronoun thou

See also
 AWST (disambiguation)
 WST (disambiguation)